Lloyd Franklin Wheat (April 27, 1923 – April 27, 2004) was an American lawyer and politician. He served as a Democratic member of the Louisiana State Senate.

Wheat was born in Metairie, Louisiana on April 27, 1923. He attended at the Louisiana State University. He served in the United States Army during World War II, and later worked as a lawyer. In 1948, he was elected to the Louisiana State Senate. Wheat succeeded A. A. Fredericks. In 1952, he was succeeded by Sylvan Friedman. Wheat died in Metairie on his 81st birthday, April 27, 2004.

References 

1923 births
2004 deaths
20th-century American politicians
Louisiana lawyers
Democratic Party Louisiana state senators
People from Metairie, Louisiana
United States Army personnel of World War II
United States Army soldiers